Eric Lafforgue (born 17 July 1964) is a French photographer. He has photographed in North Korea, making many trips there, although he is now banned due to their breaking of photography rules. Lafforgue has documented the Guna people of the San Blas Islands, off the coast of Panama, whose existence is threatened by rising sea levels. He started in 2006, and quickly his pictures were used by magazines and publications such as National Geographic.

Publications
Papous. Kubik, 2007. . Text by Almut Schneider.
Bon Baisers de Corée du Nord. Verlhac, 2012. . With a preface by Jacques Séguéla.
Banni de Corée du Nord. Hachette Tourisme, 2018. . French.

References

General references
N. Korea bans celebrated photographer Eric Lafforgue
Eric Lafforgue, bonexpose.com
Interview with Eric Lafforgue, Written by Bradt Travel Guides

External links

1964 births
French photographers
Living people